Paul Bunyan Mall is a regional shopping mall in Bemidji, Minnesota. The mall's anchor stores are Hobby Lobby, Kohl's, CosmoProf, JCPenney, Up Thrift Shop, Jo-Ann Fabrics, Maurices, and rue21. There is 1 vacant anchor store that was once Herberger's.

Developed by Cleveland-based Developers Diversified, Inc. Twin Cities-based Rauenhorst Corp. (originally Rauenhorst Const. Co.) did design as well as served as general contractor on projects.

The mall is located off Paul Bunyan Drive in Bemidji just south of the "Ridgeway" development. It was first proposed in 1976 and opened in 1977 with JCPenney, Kmart and Bostwick's as its anchor stores. Bostwick's became Herberger's in the mid-1990s.

The Kmart store closed in 2012 and became a Hobby Lobby. Kohl's has also opened in part of the former Kmart.

On April 18, 2018, it was announced that Herberger's would be closing as parent company The Bon-Ton Stores was going out of business. The store closed on August 29, 2018.

References

Shopping malls in Minnesota
Buildings and structures in Beltrami County, Minnesota
Tourist attractions in Beltrami County, Minnesota
Shopping malls established in 1977